Romona is an unincorporated community in Washington Township, Owen County, in the U.S. state of Indiana.

History
Romona was originally called Brintonville, and under the latter name was founded in 1819 by Adam Brinton. The name Romona was adopted in the 1880s, after the novel Ramona by Helen Hunt Jackson. A post office was established under the name Romona in 1886, and remained in operation until 1936.

Geography

References

Unincorporated communities in Owen County, Indiana
Unincorporated communities in Indiana